Futsal at the Pan American Games was only held at the 2007 Pan American Games in Rio de Janeiro, Brazil.

Results

Medal table

Medalists

References

Panamerican Games 2007 - Futsal (Rio de Janeiro, Brazil), RSSSF.com

 
International futsal competitions
Futsal
Futsal at multi-sport events
Futsal competitions in North America
Futsal competitions in South America